At Cooloolah is a poem by Australian poet Judith Wright. It was first published in The Bulletin magazine on 7 July 1954, and later in the poet's poetry collection The Two Fires (1955). The poem has also been printed under the titles "At Cooloola" and "At Lake Coolooah".

Outline
The poem is an examination of the Australian black-white relationship from a new angle. The poet speaks for all European people who have inhabited Australia.

Analysis
In an essay titled "Aboriginal Writers in Australia", published in Tharunka, John B. Beston notes: "Of all the white poets, Judith Wright has the deepest sense of Australia's past, before and after European settlement. In her poem "At Cooloolah" she reminds us that: 
Those dark-skinned people who once named Cooloolah 
knew that no land is lost by wars, 
for earth is spirit: the invader's feet will tangle 
in nets there and his blood be thinned by fears.

In his opening address for "2015 Reminiscence - A Tribute to Judith Wright" (5 December 2015 – 15 January 2016, Judith Wright Arts Centre), Matt Foley stated:
"Judith was a founding member of the Wildlife Preservation Society of Queensland in 1962. She campaigned hard to protect the Cooloola coloured sands against mining and to defend the Great Barrier reef and Fraser Island, much to the manifest displeasure of the then reactionary, oppressive Queensland Coalition government.

"Judith challenged us not only to see the multi-coloured beauty of our land, its flora and wildlife but also to take political action to preserve this beauty against the mindless ravages of unbridled mining and commerce. She dared us not just to see the scalding truth of the dispossession and exploitation of Aboriginal land and society, but also to take political action to redress this grinding injustice. Judith transcended the arid distinction between art and politics."

Further publications
 Five Senses : Selected Poems by Judith Wright (1963)
 Judith Wright : Collected Poems, 1942-1970 by Judith Wright (1971)
 My Country : Australian Poetry and Short Stories, Two Hundred Years edited by Leonie Kramer (1985)
 Two Centuries of Australian Poetry edited by Mark O'Connor (1988)
 A Human Pattern : Selected Poems by Judith Wright (1990)
 The Penguin Book of Modern Australian Poetry edited by John Tranter and Philip Mead (1991)
 Australian Poetry in the Twentieth Century edited by Robert Gray and Geoffrey Lehmann (1991)
 Collected Poems 1942-1985 by Judith Wright (1994)
 The Oxford Book of Australian Women's Verse edited by Susan Lever (1995)
 Australian Verse : An Oxford Anthology edited by John Leonard (1998)
 Poetry Review vol. 89 no. 1 Spring, 1999, p57
 Overland no. 154, Autumn 1999, p36
 Sunlines : An Anthology of Poetry to Celebrate Australia's Harmony in Diversity edited by Anne Fairbairn (2002)
 Hot Iron Corrugated Sky : 100 Years of Queensland Writing edited by Robyn Sheahan-Bright and Stuart Glover (2002)
 The Penguin Anthology of Australian Poetry edited by John Kinsella (2009)
 Macquarie PEN Anthology of Australian Literature edited by Nicholas Jose, Kerryn Goldsworthy, Anita Heiss, David McCooey, Peter Minter, Nicole Moore and Elizabeth Webby (2009)
 The Puncher & Wattmann Anthology of Australian Poetry edited by John Leonard (2009)
 Australian Poetry Since 1788 edited by Geoffrey Lehmann and Robert Gray (2011)
 Sense, Shape, Symbol : An Investigation of Australian Poetry edited by Brian Keyte (2013)

See also
 1954 in poetry
 1954 in literature
 1954 in Australian literature
 Australian literature

References 

Australian poems
1954 poems